

Wilhelm Meyn (3 June 1923 – 4 May 2002) was a general in the German Air Force. During World War II, he served in the Luftwaffe and was a recipient of the Knight's Cross of the Iron Cross of Nazi Germany. In 1956 he joined the Bundeswehr of West Germany and rose to the rank of general, retiring in 1979.

Awards and decorations
 German Cross in Gold on 28 January 1944 as Leutnant in the III./Sturzkampfgeschwader 3
 Knight's Cross of the Iron Cross on 24 October 1944 as Leutnant and Staffelführer of the 9./Schlachtgeschwader 3

References

Citations

Bibliography

 
 

1923 births
2002 deaths
Military personnel from Hamburg
Luftwaffe pilots
Bundeswehr generals
German World War II pilots
Recipients of the Gold German Cross
Recipients of the Knight's Cross of the Iron Cross
German prisoners of war in World War II held by the United Kingdom
Major generals of the German Air Force